The 1918 Cork Intermediate Hurling Championship was the 10th staging of the Cork Intermediate Hurling Championship since its establishment by the Cork County Board.

Nemo won the championship following a 7-5 to 0-1 defeat of Mallow in the final.

Results

Final

References

Cork Intermediate Hurling Championship
Cork Intermediate Hurling Championship